Meike Freitag (born 7 February 1979) is a German former swimmer specialised in the freestyle. A three-time Olympian (1996, 2000 and 2008) she won a total number of three medals (one silver and two bronze) as a member (heat swimmer) of the German women's relay teams. She is the daughter of two-time Olympian and butterfly swimmer Werner Freitag.

External links 
 
 
 

1979 births
Living people
German female swimmers
Olympic swimmers of Germany
Swimmers at the 1996 Summer Olympics
Swimmers at the 2000 Summer Olympics
Swimmers at the 2008 Summer Olympics
Olympic silver medalists for Germany
Olympic bronze medalists for Germany
Sportspeople from Frankfurt
Olympic bronze medalists in swimming
German female freestyle swimmers
World Aquatics Championships medalists in swimming
Medalists at the 2000 Summer Olympics
Medalists at the 1996 Summer Olympics
Olympic silver medalists in swimming
Universiade medalists in swimming
Universiade bronze medalists for Germany
Medalists at the 1999 Summer Universiade